24-7-365 is the eighth studio album by American country music artist Neal McCoy. It is also his only album for Giant Records following the closure of his previous label, Atlantic Records. Singles from this album include "Forever Works for Me" (re-titled "Forever Works for Me (Monday, Tuesday, Wednesday, Thursday)" partway through its chart run), "Every Man for Himself", and "Beatin' It In", which all charted on the Hot Country Songs charts in 2000.

Track listing
Writers per liner notes.

Charts

References

2000 albums
Neal McCoy albums
Giant Records (Warner) albums